The Philippine Futsal League is the top-flight futsal league in the Philippines. The league hosts separate competitions for both men and women. It was founded in 2009 and is organized by the futsal committee of the Philippine Football Federation, headed by Iranian coach, Esmaeil Sedigh who formerly coached the Philippines national futsal team.

Summary
Men's division

Women's division

References

Fut
Top level futsal leagues in Asia
Sports leagues established in 2009
2009 establishments in the Philippines
Futsal in the Philippines